Weng Chang-liang (born 28 May 1965) is a Taiwanese politician. He is the incumbent Magistrate of Chiayi County since 25 December 2018.

Political career
Active in the Wild Lily student movement, Weng worked for the Chiayi County Government before he served as deputy minister of Council of Agriculture under Tsao Chi-hung in 2016. Weng left the post and began campaigning to represent the Democratic Progressive Party in the 2018 Chiayi magisterial election, registering for a party primary in January 2018. He defeated Chiayi County Council speaker Chang Ming-ta in the primary, held in March.

References

External links

 

1965 births
Living people
Magistrates of Chiayi County
Politicians of the Republic of China on Taiwan from Chiayi County